Pardalabad-e Hesarooie is a village in Nosratabad Rural District, in the Central District of Zahedan County, Sistan and Baluchestan Province, Iran. At the 2006 census, its population was 74, in 12 families.

References 

Populated places in Zahedan County